Plains is an unincorporated community in Marquette County in the U.S. state of Michigan.  The community is located within Forsyth Township.  As an unincorporated community, Plains has no legally defined boundaries or population statistics of its own.

History
The community was named from its location on a plain.

References

Unincorporated communities in Marquette County, Michigan
Unincorporated communities in Michigan